The Roman Catholic Diocese of São Carlos is a diocese located in the city of São Carlos in the Ecclesiastical province of Campinas in Brazil.

History
 June 7, 1908: Established as Diocese of São Carlos do Pinhal from the Diocese of São Paulo
 November 25, 1957: Renamed as Diocese of São Carlos

Bishops

Ordinaries, in reverse chronological order
 Bishops of São Carlos 
 Bishop Paulo Cezar Costa (2016.06.22 - present)
 Bishop Paulo Sérgio Machado (2006.11.22 – 2015.12.16)
 Bishop Joviano de Lima Júnior, S.S.S. (1995.10.25 – 2006.04.05), appointed Archbishop of Ribeirão Preto, São Paulo
 Bishop Constantino Amstalden (1986.09.19 – 1995.10.25)
 Bishop Ruy Serra (1957.11.25 – 1986.09.19)
 Bishops of São Carlos do Pinhal (Roman Rite) 
 Bishop Ruy Serra (1948.02.13 – 1957.11.25)
 Bishop Gastão Liberal Pinto (1937.10.15 – 1945.10.24)
 Archbishop (personal title) José Marcondes Homem de Melo (1908.08.09 – 1937.10.15)

Coadjutor bishops
Gastão Liberal Pinto (1934-1937)
Constantino Amstalden (1971-1986)

Auxiliary bishops
Sérgio Aparecido Colombo (2001-2003), appointed Bishop of Paranavaí, Parana
Eduardo Malaspina (2018-

Other priests of this diocese who became bishops
José de Aquino Pereira, appointed Bishop of Dourados, Mato Grosso do Sul in 1958
Rubens Augusto de Souza Espínola, appointed Auxiliary Bishop of São Luís de Montes Belos, Goias in 1980
Virgílio de Pauli, appointed Bishop of Campo Mourão, Parana in 1981
José Antônio Aparecido Tosi Marques, appointed Auxiliary Bishop of São Salvador da Bahia in 1991
Bruno Gamberini, appointed Bishop of Bragança Paulista, São Paulo in 1995
Francisco José Zugliani, appointed Bishop of Amparo, São Paulo in 1997
Sérgio da Rocha, appointed Auxiliary Bishop of Fortaleza, Ceara in 2001; future Cardinal
Francisco Carlos da Silva, appointed Bishop of Ituiutaba, Minas Gerais in 2007
Luis Gonzaga Féchio, appointed Auxiliary Bishop of Belo Horizonte, Minas Gerais in 2011
Moacir Aparecido de Freitas, appointed Bishop of Votuporanga, São Paulo in 2015

References

External links
 GCatholic.org
 Catholic Hierarchy
  Diocese website (Portuguese)

Roman Catholic dioceses in Brazil
Sao Carlos, Roman Catholic Diocese of
Christian organizations established in 1908
Roman Catholic dioceses and prelatures established in the 20th century
1908 establishments in Brazil